This is a list of Natural Area Preserves (NAPs), part of the Washington Natural Areas Program managed by Washington Department of Natural Resources.

Notes

Sources

Natural Area Preserves